The 2012 Abierto Mexicano Telcel was a professional tennis tournament played on outdoor clay courts. It was the 19th edition of the men's tournament (12th for the women), which was part of the 2012 ATP World Tour and the 2012 WTA Tour. It took place in Acapulco, Mexico between 27 February and 3 March 2012. David Ferrer and Sara Errani won the singles titles.

ATP singles main draw entrants

Seeds

 1 Rankings are as of February 20, 2012

Other entrants
The following players received wildcards into the singles main draw:
  Daniel Garza
  Santiago González
  David Nalbandian
  Cesar Ramirez

The following players received entry from the qualifying draw:
  Facundo Bagnis
  Juan Sebastián Cabal
  Alessandro Giannessi
  Pere Riba

ATP doubles main draw entrants

Seeds

1 Rankings are as of February 20, 2012

Other entrants
The following pairs received wildcards into the doubles main draw:
  Luis Díaz-Barriga /  César Ramírez
  Daniel Garza /  Santiago Giraldo

The following pairs entry as alternates:
  Rui Machado /  Pere Riba
  João Souza /  Filippo Volandri

Withdrawals
  Nicolás Almagro 
  Juan Mónaco (dehydration)

Retirements
  David Ferrer (calf spasm)

WTA singles main draw entrants

Seeds

1 Rankings are as of February 20, 2012

Other entrants
The following players received wildcards into the main draw:
 Nadia Abdalá
 Ximena Hermoso
 Silvia Soler-Espinosa

The following players received entry from the qualifying draw:
 Mariana Duque-Mariño
 Edina Gallovits-Hall
 Sesil Karatantcheva
 Petra Rampre

The following players received entry as lucky loser:
 Estrella Cabeza Candela

Withdrawals
  Gisela Dulko (gastro intestinal illness)

WTA doubles main draw entrants

Seeds

1 Rankings are as of February 20, 2012

Other entrants
The following pairs received wildcards into the doubles main draw:
  Ana Paula de la Peña /  Ivette López
  Gisela Dulko /  Paola Suárez
The following pair received entry as alternates:
  Sharon Fichman /  Sun Shengnan

Withdrawals
  Yaroslava Shvedova (left thigh injury)

Finals

Men's singles

 David Ferrer defeated  Fernando Verdasco, 6–1, 6–2
It was Ferrer's 3rd title of the year and 14th of his career. It was his 3rd consecutive title at Acapulco.

Women's singles

 Sara Errani defeated  Flavia Pennetta, 5–7, 7–6(7–2), 6–0
It was Errani's 1st title of the year and 3rd of her career.

Men's doubles

 David Marrero /  Fernando Verdasco defeated
 Marcel Granollers /  Marc López 6-3, 6-4

Women's doubles

 Sara Errani /  Roberta Vinci defeated  Lourdes Domínguez Lino /  Arantxa Parra Santonja 6-2, 6-1

References

External links
 Official website

 
2012
Abierto Mexicano Telcel
Abierto Mexicano Telcel
February 2012 sports events in Mexico
March 2012 sports events in Mexico